A national fourth tier of the Scottish football league system was first established in the 1994–95 season, when the Scottish Football League was expanded to 40 clubs and split between four divisions. The fourth tier was known as the Third Division from 1994 until 2013. The Scottish Premier League and Scottish Football League merged in 2013 to form the Scottish Professional Football League, with the fourth tier becoming known as the Scottish League Two.

Scottish Football League Third Division (1994–2013)

Scottish League Two (2013–)

Total wins
20 different clubs have won the fourth tier of Scottish football since it was created in the 1994–95 season.

Clubs participating in the 2022–23 Scottish League Two are denoted in bold type.
Clubs no longer active are denoted in italics.

References

Winners
Winners
League Two winners